Sumazi was a social media and social intelligence platform for enterprises, brands, and celebrities. Its technology performs social data analysis across social networking services including Facebook, Twitter and LinkedIn, to identify key people in his/her network who are experts, influencers or are located in a specific area for marketing, advertising or sales campaigns.

The technology company was founded in 2011 by former Sun Microsystems employee Sumaya Kazi. The company was headquartered in San Francisco, California.

Reception
Sumazi was one of 25 startups selected out of more than 1,200 to compete at TechCrunch Disrupt Startup Battlefield, where it won the Omidyar Network award for the startup "Most Likely to Change the World."

Sumazi, which was based out of San Francisco, California, had been profiled in The New York Times as well as USA Today, which commented the advantages of the startup's location in the Silicon Valley. American Express OPEN Forum also featured Sumazi as a "Startup of the Week". Sumazi has additionally been mentioned in articles by Mashable, The Wall Street Journal, Current Editorials, Harvard Business Review, Smashing Magazine, and TechCrunch.

References

External links
 

Companies established in 2011
Digital marketing companies of the United States
Companies based in San Francisco
Privately held companies based in California
Social media
Social media management platforms